Lilapur is a village in Pratapgarh district, Uttar Pradesh,  India

References

Villages in Pratapgarh district, Uttar Pradesh